Mikael Ljungberg (13 June 1970 – 17 November 2004) was a Swedish wrestler from Gothenburg. He competed for Örgryte IS's wrestling section.

Ljungberg was one of the most successful Swedish wrestlers ever. He won World Championship gold medals in 1993 and 1995, European Championship gold medals in 1995 and 1999, and an Olympic gold medal in 2000.

In the summer of 2004, the Complete Book of the Olympics 2004 edition wrongly reported Mikael Ljungberg had been suspended in 1994 for using a banned performance-enhancing drug. This was silently corrected in the 2008 edition of the same book.

On 17 November 2004, while receiving care for depression at the psychiatric ward of the Mölndal hospital outside Gothenburg, he committed suicide by hanging himself. His brother reported in interviews afterwards that Mikael was a sensitive person who took setbacks seriously. Also, it was reported that his life after his professional career came to an end had been difficult for him; his mother had died in 2002, the same year as he went through a divorce.

Just before his death he was appointed manager of the sport section for the Swedish Wrestling Federation, an office he would have entered on 1 January 2005.

References 
 Wallechinsky, David and Jaime Loucky (2008). "Greco-Roman Wrestling: Heavyweight". In The Complete Book of the Olympics: 2008 Edition. London, UK: Aurum Press Limited. p. 1159.

External links 
 
 Mikael Ljungberg Memorial Fund

1970 births
2004 deaths
2004 suicides
Swedish male sport wrestlers
Wrestlers at the 1992 Summer Olympics
Wrestlers at the 1996 Summer Olympics
Wrestlers at the 2000 Summer Olympics
Olympic wrestlers of Sweden
Medalists at the 1996 Summer Olympics
Medalists at the 2000 Summer Olympics
Olympic medalists in wrestling
Olympic gold medalists for Sweden
Olympic bronze medalists for Sweden
Suicides by hanging in Sweden
Sportspeople from Gothenburg